Dinamo Tbilisi is a sports club from Tbilisi, Georgia. It was founded in 1925.

Among its highest honors, is the European trophy earned by its football team which won the Cup Winners' Cup in 1981, beating FC Carl Zeiss Jena of East Germany 2–1 in the final in Düsseldorf.

In basketball, the club won the European Champions Cup in 1962, against Real Madrid in the final, and also was the European Champions Cup finalist in 1960.

The club teams include:

 FC Dinamo Tbilisi – Men's football team
 BC Dinamo Tbilisi – Men's basketball team
 WC Dinamo Tbilsi – Men's water polo team
 Dinamo Tbilsi – Men's rugby union team

References
 Bath, Richard, ed. (1997). Complete Book of Rugby. Seven Oaks Ltd. .

Citations

 
Multi-sport clubs in Georgia (country)
1925 establishments in Georgia (country)
Sport in Tbilisi
Dynamo sports society

ro:Dinamo Tbilisi